Ahar is a city in the Central District of Ahar County, East Azerbaijan province, Iran, and serves as capital of the county. Ahar was the capital of Karadag Khanate in 18th and 19th centuries.

At the 2006 census, its population was 85,782 in 20,844 households. The following census in 2011 counted 92,608 people in 24,810 households. The latest census in 2016 showed a population of 100,641 people in 30,129 households.

Background

In the wake of the Russo-Persian War (1804–13) and with 3,500 inhabitants, Ahar was the only city of Qaradağ. Around the mid-1830s, the population was estimated to be from five to six thousand inhabitants in about 600 houses. By 1956 the population had increased to 19,816.  At the 2016 census, its population had increased to over 100,000. Despite this population boom, the city has been losing its former importance to the much smaller neighboring Kaleybar, as the latter is gaining nationwide fame as a tourist destination.

History
Ahar is one of the ancient cities of Azerbaijan, its name before Islam was "meimad".  In the 12th-13th centuries, Ahar was a minor and short-lived, but prosperous emirate ruled by the Pishteginid dynasty of Georgian origin (1155—1231).  Yaqut al-Hamawi, writing in early thirteenth century, describes Ahar as very flourishing despite its small extent.

The city lost most of its importance during the rule of Ilkhanate.  Hamdallah Mustawfi, writing in mid fourteenth century, describes Ahar as a little town. He estimates the tax revenue of the town to be comparable to that of Mardanaqom, which presently is a medium-sized village.

Ahar was in the focus of Safavid dynasty's agenda for casting of Azerbaijan as a Safavid dominion. Thus, Shah Abbas rebuilt the mausoleum of Sheikh Sheikh Shihab-al-din in Ahar.

Ahar suffered enormously during Russo-Persian War (1804–13) and Russo-Persian War (1826–28). Western travelers in 1837-1843 period had found Ahar, a city with around 700 households, in wretched condition. Their impression was that the Qajar princes, who were dispatched as the governors of Qaradagh hastened to collect as much wealth as possible before their removal.

Ahar was one of the epicenters of Persian Constitutional Revolution due to the involvement of Arasbaran tribes in armed conflicts; the revolutionary and ati-revolutionary camps were headed, respectively, by Sattar Khan and Rahimkhan Chalabianloo, both from Qaradağ region. When in 1925 Rezā Shāh deposed Ahmad Shah Qajar and founded the Pahlavi dynasty, Ahar's gradual decline started. The new king insisted on ethnic nationalism and cultural unitarism and implemented his policies with forced detribalization and sedentarization. He renamed Qaradağ as Arasbaran to deny the Turkic identity of the inhabitants. This policy, in particular, resulted in suppression of ethnic Azeris.

For further information on the history of Ahar  and Arasbaran region one may consult the following scholarly books (all in Persian language):
 H. Bayburdi "The history of Arasbaran",
  Ḥusayn Dūstī, "The history and geography of Arasbaran",
 N. Sedqi, "The contemporary political and social history of Arasbaran",
 S.R. Alemohammad, "The book of Arasbaran".

Two concise English language articles are the following:
 "The Tribes of Qarāca Dāġ: A Brief History" by P. Oberling.
 The entry "AHAR", in Encyclopædia Iranica.

Economy

Until the early 1960s Ahar was the economic hub of Arasbaran region. Arasbaran nomadic tribes bartered their produce in Ahar's bazaar. The charcoal produced in villages adjacent to Arasbaran forests was carried by muleteers to Ahar and from there was transported to Tabriz. In addition, Ahar was a distribution center for the Arasbaran rug. The gradual settlement of nomads, widespread use of fossil fuels, changing life-styles, and establishment of new marketplaces such as Kaleybar through facilitated transportation, have diminished Ahar's economical importance.

Tourism
The main tourist site in the city is the mausoleum of Sheikh Shaabe-deen, who was the teacher of Safi-ad-din Ardabili, the founder of the family of Safavid dynasty. The monument has been described by James Morier in early nineteenth century as the following, "The mausoleum is of brick, with a foundation of stone, and faced by an elevated portico, flanked by two minors or pillars encrusted with green tiles. A little wooden door was opened for us in the back of the building, which introduced us into the spot that contained the tomb of the Sheikh, which was enclosed by a stone railing, carved into open work, and surrounded by a sculptured arabesque ornament, of very good taste. The tomb is distinguished by a marble cover, on which is an Arabic inscription in relieve.".

Notable people
All notable people from Arasbaran region would have counted Ahar as their home town. Here we list some prominent figures who have spent parts of their lives in Ahar or the neighboring villages:
 Sattar Khan was originally from Qaradağ. He is considered as a national hero of Iran and is referred to as  سردار ملی  (meaning National Commander). He headed Constitutionalist rebels from the Amirkhiz district of Tabriz in early twentieth century. 
 Amir Arshad, the headman of Haji-Alilu tribe, was a legendary military commander in early twentieth century. He is credited with fending off the communism from Iran.  
 Qasem Ahari  was born in Ahar in 1884. He was the first European trained ophthalmologist of Iran. Qasem Ahari served four terms in National Consultative Assembly. He was the first representative of Azerbaijan in Senate of Iran.  
Abbas Eslami, known with his pen-name Barez, (1932-2011) was a great poet. He described the melancholic demise of Qaradağ in a book titled mourning Sabalan (ياسلي ساوالان).
 Houssein Rezapour a contemporary poet with the pen-name "Razi". 
 Prof. Mahmoud Akhondi (محمود آخوندى) was born ii 1933. He is an eminent Swiss-trained law professor. His 10 volume book on criminal prosecution is a major textbook in Iranian law schools.   
 Colonel Husein bayburdi (حسين بايبوردي) was born in Ahar and retired from Army in 1959. He wrote and published a book on the history of Arasbaran. This book is, perhaps, the only comprehensive original source on Arasbaran.
  Ḥusayn Dūstī  (حسین دوستی), was born in Ahar. He is a prolific writer of books dealing with Arasbaran.

Photo gallery

References 

Ahar County

Cities in East Azerbaijan Province

Populated places in East Azerbaijan Province

Populated places in Ahar County